General elections were held in the Turks and Caicos Islands on 29 May 1984. The result was a victory for the ruling Progressive National Party (PNP), which won eight of the eleven seats in the Legislative Council, including Kew North Caicos, where Rosita Butterfield became the islands' first female Legislative Council member. Following the elections, PNP leader Norman Saunders remained Chief Minister.

Electoral system
The eleven members of the Legislative Council were elected from single-member constituencies.

Campaign
A total of 22 candidates contested the elections, with both the PNP and People's Democratic Movement (PDM) running in all eleven constituencies.

Results

References

Elections in the Turks and Caicos Islands
Turks
1984 in the Turks and Caicos Islands
May 1984 events in North America